Michael Faber (18 March 1939 – 23 December 1993) was an East German footballer who played as a left-back.

Club career 
He played more than 260 East German top-flight matches for Lokomotive Leipzig and a couple of other former sides from Leipzig.

International career 
Faber made his international debut for East Germany on 17 December 1963, starting in the away match against Burma, which finished as a 5–1 win.

Career statistics

International

References

External links
 
 
 
 

1939 births
1993 deaths
East German footballers
East Germany international footballers
Association football fullbacks
1. FC Lokomotive Leipzig players
DDR-Oberliga players